Ramola Devi (7 July 1917 – 10 December 1988) was an Indian Jewish actress of Baghdadi origin. Born Rachel Cohen, she became famous in the movie "The Cashier" (Khazanchi) from 1941. She was a very successful movie star throughout India in the 1940s until 1951 when her acting career ended.

Early life 
Ramola Devi was born as Rachel Cohen in 1917 in Bombay, British India, to a Jewish family whose roots are in Baghdad, Iraq. Her father Haim Cohen, a school principal, who moved the family to Calcutta where she graduated from school. Together with her two sisters, Ramola acted on stage as an amateur before entering films. Ramola was drawn to the stage profession from a young age, and immediately after graduating she decided to pursue her dream.

Career 
She appeared in theater plays and a number of short and local Bengali films, such as Graher Pher in 1937 but tried to break as an Indian national actress.

Ramola approached various producers, until the producer Kidar Sharma, who was very well known in the industry, agreed to give her a chance. Jedgish Sethi was the one who introduced between them . Sharma was at that time a producer, lyricist and screenwriter, mainly wrote dialogues for films but did not direct. Kedar Sharma pitched her to director Nitin Bose, who was a very famous director at that time. Bose made fun of her hight and she was heart broken, then Sharma promised her that once he became a director he will give her the main role in his film.

Kidar Sharma kept his promise and cast her in his first film as a director in 1939  Dil Hi To Hai, a film about  a middle-class father who sacrificed his whole life to educate his son and daughter, Ramola played the role of the daughter who broke her father's heart.

Her big breakthrough came in 1941 with the very successful black and white film Khazanchi, in the film which was a murder mystery, she played the main character "Madhuri". The film was one of the biggest hits of the early 1940s in India. The film's music composed by Ghulam Haider was a big part in revolutionizing Hindi film music from the theatrical style of the 1930s to a more of a free style using Punjabi folk rhythms in the 1940s as in the famous song from the film "Sawan Kai Nazare hain".

After the big succes of her film Ramola kept acting in many movies which became very popular among the Indian audience. Ramola's acting career took off quickly, winning both the sympathy of the Indian audience and the sympathy of the critics. 

Her famous movies were: Khamoshi (1942), Shukria (1944), Albeli (1945), Hum Bhi Insan Hain (1948) and more.

Her last three films were released in 1951 and thus ended her film career.

Personal life 
Ramola was married and had a one son, she died in her apartment in Mumbai on 10 December 1988.

Filmography 

 Graher Pher 1937
 Dil Hi To Hai 1939
 Qaidi 1940
 Khazanchi 1941
 Albeli 1945
 Shukria 1944
 Jhooti Kasmen 1948
 Hum Bhi Insaan Hain 1948
 Do Baten 1949
 Sawan Aya Re 1949
 Rim Jhim 1949
 Maang 1950
 Basera 1950
 Jawani Ki Aag 1951
 Actor 1951
 Stage 1951

References

External links 
 Ramola&Wasti_G M Durrani_ Lata_Saghir Usmani_Ghulam Mohd
 The song Sawan Ke Nazare Hai from the movie Khazanchi. 

1917 births
1988 deaths
Indian film actresses
Actresses from Mumbai